The 1986 European Open  was a women's tennis tournament played on outdoor clay courts in Lugano, Switzerland that was part of the 1986 Virginia Slims World Championship Series. It was the 10th edition of the tournament and was held from 19 May until 25 May 1986. Third-seeded Raffaella Reggi won the singles title.

Finals

Singles

 Raffaella Reggi defeated  Manuela Maleeva 5–7, 6–3, 7–6(8–6)
 It was Reggi's 1st singles title of the year and the 2nd of her career.

Doubles

 Elise Burgin /  Betsy Nagelsen defeated  Jenny Byrne /  Janine Thompson 6–2, 6–3

References

External links
 ITF tournament edition details

Swiss Open
WTA Swiss Open
1986 in Swiss tennis
1986 in Swiss women's sport